Walter Alfred Uzdavinis (June 9, 1911 – December 23, 1988) was an American football end who played one season with the Cleveland Rams of the National Football League. He played college football at Fordham University and attended Brockton High School in Brockton, Massachusetts.

References

External links
Just Sports Stats

1911 births
1988 deaths
People from Middleborough, Massachusetts
Sportspeople from Plymouth County, Massachusetts
Players of American football from Massachusetts
American football ends
Fordham Rams football players
Boston Shamrocks (AFL) players
Cleveland Rams players